The 2010–11 Federal Hockey League season was the inaugural season of the Federal Hockey League.  The Akwesasne Warriors won the season championship.

Regular season
On December 17, the Broome County Barons announced that they would leave Chenango, New York.  The team relocated to Cape Cod and resumed play on January 18.  The league truncated the original 60-game schedule to less than 50 games in early February.  The Rome Frenzy suspended operations shortly thereafter.

 Advanced to playoffs

Playoffs 

Reference:

References

External links 
 Federal Hockey League website

FHL
Federal Prospects Hockey League seasons